Longueval is a commune in the Somme department in Hauts-de-France in northern France.

Geography
Longueval is found in the north-east of the département, almost equidistant to the surrounding towns of Péronne (to the east), Albert (west) and Bapaume (north).

Population

Heraldry

History

The village was almost completely destroyed during World War I.

World War I sites 
Caterpillar Valley Cemetery is located outside Longueval, on the road to Bazentin. The cemetery also contains a Memorial to the Missing from New Zealand, recording the names of 1272 men lost in 1916. The body for the New Zealand Tomb of the Unknown Warrior was taken from here.

South of Longueval is the Longueval Road Cemetery. In the centre of the village is the Pipers' Memorial, built to commemorate bagpipers who fought in the First World War. Longueval was chosen because it was retaken by the 9th (Scottish) Division in July 1916. To the east of the village is the South African War Memorial Delville Wood.

On 21 October 2010, the Footballers' Battalions Memorial was unveiled at Longueval, near Delville Wood, to commemorate those from the Footballers' Battalions who had fought and died in the Great War.

See also
 Delville Wood
 Communes of the Somme department

References

External links

  360° Longueval Museum
  360° Longueval Military cemetery

Longueval